CKKQ-FM (100.3 The Q) is a broadcast radio station in Victoria, British Columbia, Canada. CKKQ broadcasts at a frequency of 100.3 MHz on the FM band. The station has broadcast a mainstream rock format since its inception, but has a more classic rock sound since 2001, when sister station CKXM AM/-FM became The Zone @ 91.3 with the CJZN calls and an alternative rock format. It used to have an adult album alternative lean up until Pattison took over the station from OK Radio.

The station placed 2nd in the fall 2018 Numeris Diary Survey for Victoria

History
In April 1987, the OK Radio Group Ltd. (known at the time as Victoria Communications Ltd.) was granted an FM radio license and launched 100.3 The Q, then known as Q-100, in December 1987. The first song played was The Rolling Stones' "Start Me Up".

In May 1999, CKKQ and sister station CKXM (formerly CKDA-AM) (now known as CJZN-FM (The Zone @ 91-3)) moved to the top floor of 2750 Quadra Street, a three-storey Victoria office building purchased by the OK Radio Group Ltd. in the fall of 1998.

Thanks to the prime position of CKKQ's transmitter on the Malahat Ridge, its signal reaches up Vancouver Island as far north as Nanaimo, onto the Lower Mainland as far east as Kent and into Washington as far south as Tacoma, on a good day. In 2000, CKKQ added a transmitter in Sooke on the frequency 94.7 FM with the callsign CKKQ-FM-1.

In 2001, CKKQ actually achieved a 0.1 share in the American Arbitron ratings for Seattle/Tacoma, placing them 45th in the overall standings.  This led Ed Bain and The Q! Morning Show into a chant of "We're 45th! We're 45th!"

On December 1, 2006, CKKQ and CJZN came under the ownership of the Jim Pattison Broadcast Group LP.

The Q Morning Show

One of the original 26 employees, Ed Bain has spent 33 years of his 44-year career at CKKQ hosting The Q Morning Show.

The QMS (short for Q Morning Show) lineup consists of Bain and news/sports announcer Cliff LeQuesne.  While there have been four producers and at least five news or sports announcers, Ed Bain has been the one constant on the show since CKKQ's launch.

Ed Bain
Ed Bain (born 1955) is the radio personality and the CHEK-TV weather reporter.

While Ed became well known in Victoria from public appearances for CKKQ, both in person and as part of outdoor advertising, his visibility greatly improved when, in 2001, he became the full-time weekday weather reporter for Victoria television station CHEK-TV, where he injects much of the same humour he's known for on The Q Morning Show, albeit slightly toned down for the older television audience. Ed Bain is an avid collector of German World War II trinkets.

References

External links
100.3 The Q

Kkq
Kkq
Kkq
Kkq
Radio stations established in 1987
1987 establishments in British Columbia